Sama Hawa Camara (born 22 December 1994) is a French judoka.

She is the bronze medallist of the 2017 Judo Grand Slam Paris in the -78 kg category.

References

External links
 

1994 births
Living people
French female judoka
21st-century French women